Alan McIntosh Gates (born March 25, 1958) is the sixteenth and current bishop of the Episcopal Diocese of Massachusetts.

Biography 
He is a Massachusetts native and graduate of Middlebury College. Prior to seminary he was a Russian language translator, researcher and intelligence analyst for the U.S. Department of Defense, including a tour of duty at the State Department. After studies at Episcopal Divinity School he was ordained to the diaconate on June 13, 1987, and to the priesthood on March 26, 1988. He served congregations in the Episcopal dioceses of Massachusetts, Western Massachusetts and Chicago prior to his call to Ohio in 2004.  He served as the rector of St. Paul's Church in Cleveland Heights until his election as bishop in 2014. He was consecrated as a bishop on September 13, 2014.

Bishop Gates is currently on the board of the Anglican Theological Review.  He serves on the Episcopal Church's Standing Commission on World Mission, and is a member of Bishops United Against Gun Violence. He and his spouse, Patricia J. Harvey, have two adult children.

See also 
 List of Episcopal bishops of the United States
 Historical list of the Episcopal bishops of the United States

References

External links 
Alan Gates of Ohio elected bishop of Diocese of Massachusetts
Massachusetts diocese ordains Alan M. Gates as bishop

Living people
Place of birth missing (living people)
Middlebury College alumni
1958 births
Episcopal bishops of Massachusetts